Nikita Leonidovich Novitskii (born 24 August 2000) is a Russian freestyle skier. He competed in the 2022 Winter Olympics.

Career
Novitskii won a gold medal at the 2019 Junior World Championships in the moguls event. He placed fourth in moguls in the 2021 World Championships. He finished 13th out of 30 competitors in the first qualifying round in the men's moguls event at the 2022 Winter Olympics. He then finished 13th out of 20 competitors in the first final round, eliminating him from medal contention.

References

2000 births
Living people
Sportspeople from Irkutsk Oblast
Freestyle skiers at the 2022 Winter Olympics
Russian male freestyle skiers
Olympic freestyle skiers of Russia